Central library may refer to:

Canada
 Calgary Central Library, Alberta
 Mississauga Central Library, Ontario
 North York Central Library, Toronto, Ontario
 Halifax Central Library, Nova Scotia

Denmark 
 Odense Central Library

Finland 
 Helsinki Central Library

Hong Kong
 Hong Kong Central Library

India
 Central Library, IIT, Bombay
 Sayaji Rao Gaekwad Library at Banaras Hindu University, in Varanasi, Uttar Pradesh

Iran 
 Central Library of Astan Quds Razavi, in Mashad

Italy
 National Central Library (Florence)
 National Central Library (Rome)

Japan 
 Tenri Central Library

Mexico 
 Central Library (UNAM), at the National Autonomous University of Mexico

New Zealand
 Christchurch Central Library

Pakistan 
 Central Library Bahawalpur

Singapore
 Central Library, NUS, of the National University of Singapore

South Africa 
 Central Library Cape Town

Spain 
 Central Library of Cantabria

Switzerland 
 Zurich Central Library

Taiwan 
 National Central Library

United Arab Emirates 
 Dubai Central Library

United Kingdom

England 
 Central Library, Blackpool
 Birkenhead Central Library
 Birmingham Central Library
 Bristol Central Library
 Croydon Central Library
 Derby Central Library
 Imperial College Central Library
 Kensington Central Library
 Leeds Central Library
 Liverpool Central Library
 Manchester Central Library
 Oxford Central Library
 Reading Central Library
 Sheffield Central Library
 Stockport Central Library

Northern Ireland 
 Belfast Central Library

Scotland 
 Central Library, Aberdeen
 Central Library, Edinburgh

Wales 
 Cardiff Central Library
 Old Swansea Central Library

United States

California 
 Los Angeles Central Library
 Sacramento City Library
 Norman F. Feldheym Central Library, San Bernardino
 San Diego Central Library

Florida 
 Hart Memorial Central Library, Kissimmee

Georgia 
 Atlanta Central Library

Maryland 
 NOAA Central Library, in Silver Spring

Massachusetts 
 Central Library (Somerville, Massachusetts)

Minnesota 
 Minneapolis Central Library

Missouri 
 Central Library (Kansas City, Missouri)

New York 
 Central Library (Brooklyn Public Library)

Oregon 
 Central Library (Portland, Oregon)

Pennsylvania 
 Parkway Central Library, Philadelphia

Texas 
 J. Erik Jonsson Central Library, Dallas
 Old Dallas Central Library

Wisconsin 
 Central Library (Milwaukee, Wisconsin)

Washington 
 Seattle Central Library

See also 
 State Central Library (disambiguation)